Heathcote  is a town in central Victoria, Australia, situated on the Northern Highway 110 kilometres north of Melbourne and 40 kilometres south-east of Bendigo via the McIvor Highway. Heathcote's local government area is the City of Greater Bendigo and it is part of the federal electorate of Bendigo and the state electorate of Euroa.

History
The first European known to have visited the district was Major Thomas Mitchell in 1836.  By 1851 about 400 Europeans lived on some 16 pastoral properties in the area.

Late in 1852 gold was discovered at McIvor Creek.  Within six months some 40,000 miners were camped in the vicinity.  It proved to be one of the richest finds during the Australian gold rushes, but the gold was so easily found that it was soon largely exhausted and by the end of the year a large proportion of the miners had already left for other recent finds (although deeper deposits continued to be mined for many years).  This was not before the Victorian government gazetted the township of Heathcote on the site and ordered the construction of several official buildings.  The post office opened on 1 July 1853 as McIvor Creek but six months later, on 1 January 1854, was renamed Heathcote.

With the decline of gold mining the region took on an increased importance as a pastoral district.

Heathcote was served by the Heathcote railway line from 1889 to 1968.

The Heathcote Magistrates' Court closed on 1 January 1990.

Gold Escort Robbery

Mia Mia was the location of a violent gold escort robbery on 20 July 1853. A gang of at least six robbers and possibly as large as twelve bailed up a gold escort that departed Heathcote on the way to Kyneton. The robbers opened fire on the six escorters in which four were wounded. The other two fled to Heathcote to raise the alarm. When help arrived they found that the robbers and the gold was gone. All the robbers were living in Heathcote at the time working the gold diggings. Later John Francis gave crown evidence against the others and three of the villains were hanged.

This took place very close to where one of Australia's worst aviation disasters occurred in 1945.

Heathcote is the closest major town to the Heathcote-Graytown National Park and Lake Eppalock.

Present
The town hosts an agricultural show on Melbourne Cup day, each November.

Food & Wine

A weekend early in October is dedicated to the Heathcote Wine and Food Festival held at the show grounds. This is a dynamic event that has grown rapidly since its inception in 1994.

  The town is the centre of the recognised Heathcote wine region, notable for its Shiraz wines. In 2010 the Heathcote Winery won a gold medal at the Queensland Wine Show. In 2013, the Sanguine Estate Shiraz 2012 was awarded the category winner, a gold medal and a top 10 position in World's Greatest Syrah & Shiraz Challenge.

Sport

The town has several sporting teams;

Basketball: One of the most celebrated sports teams in Heathcote, the Heathcote Panthers Basketball Club with both junior and senior teams ranging from the under 10's and under 12's in both boys and girls under 14's and under 16's boys and also both an adult men's and ladies' team.

Australian Rules: The town has an Australian Rules football team playing in the Heathcote District Football League.

Heathcote managed to capture back to back premierships in 2009/10. Heathcote continued to thrive over the next two seasons playing off in the Grand Final until a mass exodus of players.

Despite the reluctance of many to play alongside such a divisive character, the Saints maintained their century-long streak of at least one win per season.

Cricket: The Heathcote Cricket Club competes in the Northern United Cricket Association and celebrated back to back premiership success in seasons 2012/13 & 2013/14, due to local Superstar and the regions playboy Dion Meerman. Whilst the departure of Meerman in the off season left the Heathcote cricket community reeling, the saints, under the captaincy of Fish Conforti were unable to deliver a 3 peat and subsequently has been the only skipper not to deliver a premiership since admission into the NUCA. In 2016/17 under the tutelage of 2 time premiership player Corey Gilmore, the saints began to reaffirm themselves as a force of the NUCA competition. Ultimately the Saints finished 3rd that year and was seen as a lost opportunity. The following year the saints recruited heavily especially with the marquee signing of Shane Cox, who signed on for a box of socos and hit the winning runs in the 2018 grand final win. 2019/2020 saw a disappointing end to the cricket season with Corey Gilmore and Patrick Ring failing with the bat at a crucial point in the game to gift the Colbo ducks the win in the semi finial. On a positive note Ben Connelly the club's 5th best leg spinner registered his first wicket with the club in 5 seasons.

Golf: Golfers play at the Heathcote Golf Course, a quality 18 hole championship course.

Motor Racing/Athletics & Horse Racing: Heathcote has a harness track (2040m) that also acts as a speedway.

References

J. O. Randell, McIvor, A History of the Shire and the Township of Heathcote, published by the author, East Melbourne, 1985.

External links
 

Mining towns in Victoria (Australia)
Towns in Victoria (Australia)
Bendigo
Suburbs of Bendigo